Pokaew Fonjangchonburi (โพธิ์แก้ว ฝนจางชลบุรี) is a Thai Muay Thai kickboxer.

Titles and accomplishments
Professional Boxing Association of Thailand (PAT) 
 1998 Thailand 118 lbs Champion
 2003 Thailand 122 lbs Champion
Rajadamnern Stadium 
 2004 Rajadamnern Stadium 122 lbs Champion
Lumpinee Stadium 
 2006 Lumpinee Stadium 122 lbs Champion
Omnoi Stadium 
 2003 Omnoi Stadium 118 lbs Champion
 2001 Isuzu Cup Runner-up

Muay Thai record

|-  style="background:#fbb;"
| 2015-09-04|| Loss||align=left| Rodlek P.K. Saenchaimuaythaigym || Lumpinee Stadium || Bangkok, Thailand || Decision || 5 || 3:00
|-  style="background:#c5d2ea;"
| 2015-07-21|| Draw||align=left| Nawapon Lookpakrist || Lumpinee Stadium || Bangkok, Thailand || Decision || 5 || 3:00
|-  style="background:#fbb;"
| 2015-04-21|| Loss||align=left| Patakthep Sinbeemuaythai || Lumpinee Stadium || Bangkok, Thailand || Decision || 5 || 3:00
|-  style="background:#fbb;"
| 2014-12-09 ||Loss||align=left| Yodtongthai Kiatjaroenchai || Lumpinee Stadium || Bangkok, Thailand || TKO (Elbow) || 2 ||
|-  style="background:#fbb;"
| 2014-08-29 || Loss ||align=left| Muangthai PKSaenchaimuaythaigym  || Lumpinee Stadium || Bangkok, Thailand || KO (Left Elbow) || 2 || 1:45
|-  style="background:#cfc;"
| 2014-08-05|| Win||align=left| Muangthai PKSaenchaimuaythaigym || Lumpinee Stadium || Thailand || Decision || 5 || 3:00
|-  style="background:#cfc;"
| 2014-07-08 ||Win||align=left| Pornsanae Sitmonchai || Lumpinee Stadium || Bangkok, Thailand || TKO (punches) || 2 ||
|-  style="background:#fbb;"
| 2014-03-02 || Loss ||align=left| Songkom Srisuriyunyothin || Channel 7 Boxing Stadium || Bangkok, Thailand || Decision || 5 || 3:00
|-  style="background:#c5d2ea;"
| 2014-01-28 || Draw ||align=left| Jompichit Chuwattana || Lumpinee Stadium || Bangkok, Thailand || Decision || 5 || 3:00
|-  style="background:#fbb;"
| 2013-10-25 ||Loss||align=left| Kaewkangwan Kaiyanghadao || Lumpinee Stadium || Bangkok, Thailand || Decision || 5 || 3:00
|-  style="background:#fbb;"
| 2013-07-16 ||Loss||align=left| Pettawee Sor Kittichai || Lumpinee Stadium || Bangkok, Thailand || Decision || 5 || 3:00
|-  style="background:#fbb;"
| 2013-06-07 || Loss||align=left| Phetmorakot Petchyindee Academy || Lumpinee Stadium || Bangkok, Thailand || TKO (knees)  || 3 || 
|-
! style=background:white colspan=9 |
|-  style="background:#cfc;"
| 2013-05-07|| Win||align=left| Thanonchai Thanakorngym || Lumpinee Stadium || Bangkok, Thailand || Decision || 5 || 3:00
|-  style="background:#fbb;"
| 2013-03-30 || Loss||align=left| Penake Sitnumnoi ||  || Koh Samui, Thailand || Decision || 5 || 3:00
|-
! style=background:white colspan=9 |
|-  style="background:#fbb;"
| 2013-03-10 || Loss||align=left| Yetkin Özkul || Le Choc des Légendes || Paris, France || DQ (Strikes after the bell) || 2 || 3:00
|-  style="background:#c5d2ea;"
| 2013-02-07 || Draw ||align=left| Sam-A Gaiyanghadao || Rajadamnern Stadium || Bangkok, Thailand || Decision || 5 || 3:00
|-
|-  style="background:#fbb;"
| 2012-12-07 ||Loss||align=left| Sam-A Gaiyanghadao || Lumpinee Stadium || Bangkok, Thailand || Decision || 5 || 3:00 
|-
! style=background:white colspan=9 |
|-  style="background:#cfc;"
| 2012-11-06 || Win||align=left| Ritidej Thor.Thepsuthin  || Lumpinee Stadium || Bangkok, Thailand || Decision || 5 || 3:00
|-  style="background:#cfc;"
| 2012-10-04 || Win ||align=left| Petpanomrung Kiatmuu9  || Wanmitchai Fights, Rajadamnern Stadium || Bangkok, Thailand || Decision || 5 || 3:00
|-  style="background:#cfc;"
| 2012-09-11 || Win||align=left| Tong PuiD9D || Lumpinee Stadium || Bangkok, Thailand || Decision || 5 || 3:00
|-  style="background:#cfc;"
| 2012-07-06 || Win||align=left| Petpanomrung Kiatmuu9 || Suekpetchpiya Fights, Lumpinee Stadium || Bangkok, Thailand || Decision || 5 || 3:00
|-  style="background:#cfc;"
| 2012-05-01 || Win||align=left| Rungrat Sor Jor.Toipaedriew || Lumpinee Stadium || Bangkok, Thailand || Decision || 5 || 3:00
|-  style="background:#fbb;"
| 2012-03-09 || Loss||align=left| Thong Puideenaidee || Lumpinee Stadium || Bangkok, Thailand || Decision || 5 || 3:00
|-  style="background:#cfc;"
| 2012-01-12 || Win||align=left| Lekkla Thanasuranakorn || Rajadamnern Stadium || Bangkok, Thailand || Decision || 5 || 3:00
|-  style="background:#cfc;"
| 2011-09-09 || Win||align=left| Lekkla Thanasuranakorn || Lumpinee Stadium || Bangkok, Thailand || Decision || 5 || 3:00
|-  style="background:#fbb;"
| 2011-07-10|| Loss||align=left| Saenkeng Chor.Nopparat || Channel 7 Boxing Stadium || Thailand || Decision|| 5 || 3:00
|-  style="background:#fbb;"
| 2011-05-27|| Loss||align=left| Penake Sitnumnoi || Lumpinee Stadium || Thailand || Decision|| 5 || 3:00
|-  style="background:#fbb;"
| 2011-03-08 ||Loss ||align=left| Sam-A Gaiyanghadao || Lumpinee Stadium || Bangkok, Thailand || Decision || 5 || 3:00
|-  style="background:#cfc;"
| 2011-01-25 || Win||align=left| Sanghirun Lukbanyai || Lumpinee Stadium || Bangkok, Thailand || Decision || 5 || 3:00
|-  style="background:#cfc;"
| 2010-11-28 ||Win||align=left| Santipath Siti Ubon || Channel 7 Boxing Stadium || Bangkok, Thailand || Decision || 5 || 3:00
|-  style="background:#fbb;"
| 2010-09-10 ||Loss ||align=left| Phetek Kiatyongyut || Pumpanmuang Fight, Lumpinee Stadium || Bangkok, Thailand || Decision || 5 || 3:00
|-  style="background:#fbb;"
| 2007-07-03 || ||align=left| Famechai FA.Group || Lumpinee Stadium || Bangkok, Thailand || Decision || 5 || 3:00
|-  style="background:#fbb;"
| 2007-03-02 || Loss ||align=left| Pinsiam Sor.Amnuaysirichoke || Lumpinee Stadium || Bangkok, Thailand || Decision || 5 || 3:00
|-
! style=background:white colspan=9 |
|-  style="background:#cfc;"
| 2007-01-30 || Win ||align=left| Nong-O Gaiyanghadao || Phetyindee Fights, Lumpinee Stadium || Bangkok, Thailand || Decision || 5 || 3:00
|-  style="background:#fbb;"
| 2006-11-09 || Loss||align=left| Nong-O Gaiyanghadao || Phetjaopraya Fights, Lumpinee Stadium || Bangkok, Thailand || Decision || 5 || 3:00
|-  style="background:#cfc;"
| 2006-10-18 || Win||align=left| Nong-O Gaiyanghadao || Phetpiya Fights, Lumpinee Stadium || Bangkok, Thailand || Decision || 5 || 3:00
|-
! style=background:white colspan=9 |
|-  style="background:#cfc;"
| 2005-08-10 ||Win||align=left| Pettawee Sor Kittichai || Rajadamnern Stadium || Bangkok, Thailand || Decision || 5 || 3:00
|-  style="background:#cfc;"
| 2004-02-12 || Win||align=left| Densiam Lukprabat || Rajadamnern Stadium || Bangkok, Thailand || Decision || 5 || 3:00
|-
! style=background:white colspan=9 |
|-  style="background:#fbb;"
| 2004-04-10 || Loss||align=left| Densayam Lukprabat || Rajadamnern Stadium || Bangkok, Thailand || Decision || 5 || 3:00
|-
! style=background:white colspan=9 |
|-  style="background:#cfc;"
| 2004-03-20 || Win||align=left| Phutawan Buriramphukaofai|| Rajadamnern Stadium || Bangkok, Thailand || Decision || 5 || 3:00
|-  style="background:#cfc;"
| 2003-10-24 || Win||align=left| Rittidet Newmuangkhon|| Lumpinee Stadium || Bangkok, Thailand || Decision || 5 || 3:00

|-  style="background:#cfc;"
| 2003-02-01 || Win||align=left| Yodlada Daopaedriew ||  Omnoi Stadium ||Samut Sakhon, Thailand || Decision || 5 || 3:00
|-
! style=background:white colspan=9 |

|-  style="background:#cfc;"
| 2002-07-27 || Win||align=left| Pinsiam Sor.Amnuaysirichoke ||  Omnoi Stadium ||Samut Sakhon, Thailand || Decision || 5 || 3:00

|-  style="background:#fbb;"
| 2002-05-11 || Loss||align=left| Rungjarat SKV Gym || Omnoi Stadium || Samut Sakhon, Thailand || Decision || 5 || 3:00

|-  style="background:#cfc;"
| 2001-06-09 || Win||align=left| Banpot Tor.Silanoi ||  Omnoi Stadium ||Samut Sakhon, Thailand || Decision || 5 || 3:00

|-  style="background:#fbb;"
| 2001-03-24 || Loss||align=left| Sanchernglek Jirakriangkrai || Omnoi Stadium - Isuzu Cup Final || Samut Sakhon, Thailand || Decision || 5 || 3:00
|-
! style=background:white colspan=9 |

|-  style="background:#cfc;"
| 2001-01-20 || Win||align=left| Komkrit Tor.Phithakkonkan||  Omnoi Stadium - Isuzu Cup ||Samut Sakhon, Thailand || Decision || 5 || 3:00

|-  style="background:#cfc;"
| 2000-12-02 || Win||align=left| Kongpipop Petchyindee ||  Omnoi Stadium - Isuzu Cup ||Samut Sakhon, Thailand || Decision || 5 || 3:00

|-  bgcolor="#cfc"
| 1998-12-23 || Win ||align=left| Anuwat Kaewsamrit ||  || Bangkok, Thailand || Decision || 5 ||3:00

|-  style="background:#cfc;"
| 1998-04-18 || Win||align=left| Wuttidet Lukprabat ||  Omnoi Stadium ||Samut Sakhon, Thailand || Decision || 5 || 3:00
|-
| colspan=9 | Legend:

See also
List of male kickboxers

References

1979 births
Living people
Pokaew Fonjangchonburi
Pokaew Fonjangchonburi